The Mackenzie Highway is a Canadian highway in northern Alberta and the Northwest Territories.  It begins as Alberta Highway 2 at Mile Zero in Grimshaw, Alberta. After the first , it becomes Alberta Highway 35 for the balance of its length through Alberta and then becomes Northwest Territories Highway 1.

Route description 
The Mackenzie Highway is designated as part of Canada's National Highway System, holding core route status from its terminus at Grimshaw to its intersection with the Yellowknife Highway, and northern/remote route status for the remainder of the route to its northern terminus at Wrigley.

Originally begun in 1938, prior to World War II, the project was abandoned at the outbreak of war. It resumed in the late 1940s and completed to Hay River, Northwest Territories, in 1948/1949, but some sections, particularly in the vicinity of Steen River, remained difficult.

Much of the extension is now known as Northwest Territories Highway 3, or the Yellowknife Highway. The  stretch from Enterprise to Hay River is Northwest Territories Highway 2.

Around 1970, the highway was extended west from what is now the southern terminus of Highway 3 to reach Fort Simpson, and in 1971, when the section to Fort Simpson was opened to traffic, work began to prepare a road grade from there to Wrigley, but the work was abandoned. The roadway, which starts at a junction  from the island that includes "downtown" Fort Simpson, was finally opened in 1994 and includes the N'dulee ferry and ice crossings.

On November 8, 2013, the portion of the highway from the Alberta/Northwest Territories border to Enterprise was designated the Highway of Heroes.

There are social and economic studies being done on the extension of the highway north from Wrigley to join the Dempster Highway; the territorial government has completed 34 bridges across all but six of the widest river crossings that serve the ice road and await the all-weather route. In June 2018, an announcement of $140 million funding would result in a bridge over Great Bear River and extend the Mackenzie Highway's all-weather road north by 15 km to Mount Gaudet.

Just east of Fort Simpson's airport, the highway crosses the Liard River by ferry (summer) and ice bridge (winter).  further east of the crossing, the location known as Checkpoint is the site of a former gas station at the junction with the Liard Highway (Northwest Territories Highway 7, British Columbia Highway 77) from Fort Nelson, British Columbia.

Major intersections

Photo gallery

References

External links 

Highway 1 - Northwest Territories Department of Transportation
1948 Mackenzie Highway, Grimshaw to Hay River
Mackenzie Valley Highway to Tuktoyaktuk

Alberta provincial highways, 1–216 series
Northwest Territories territorial highways